Tolevamer is a medication developed to combat Clostridium difficile associated diarrhea. It is a potassium sodium polystyrene sulfonate. It was never marketed.

Mechanism of action
Tolevamer was designed to bind the enterotoxins of Clostridium difficile. Since it has no antibiotic properties, it does not harm the gut flora. Early studies used the sodium salt, but it was soon replaced with the potassium sodium salt to prevent hypokalaemia, which is often associated with diarrhea.

History

Termination of development
In early 2008, a noninferiority study versus vancomycin or metronidazole for Clostridium difficile associated diarrhea (CDAD) found that about half of the patients in the tolevamer group did not complete the treatment, versus 25% in the vancomycin and 29% in the metronidazole groups. CDAD recurrence in patients reaching clinical success was reduced significantly by tolevamer (6% recurrence rate), vancomycin (18%) and metronidazole (19%). However, the good result of tolevamer is partly due to the high drop-out rate in this group. Since tolevamer did not reach its primary endpoint in this study, its development was halted.

References 

Antidiarrhoeals
Sulfonic acids